Polymorphomyia striola is a species of tephritid or fruit flies in the genus Polymorphomyia of the family Tephritidae.

Distribution
Guyana.

References

Tephritinae
Insects described in 1805
Diptera of South America